Garry Mountford (born 26 November 1983 in Wakefield, England) is a Scottish rugby union player who plays for Stirling County. He previously played for Glasgow Warriors at the Tighthead Prop position.

Rugby Union career

Amateur career

He represents Stirling County.

Professional career

Mountford was called into the Glasgow squad along with Gala's Luke Pettie to help cover the front row in 2012-13 season.

Mountford then played for Glasgow Warriors in the Pro12 match against Ulster rugby.

International career

He has represented Scotland at Club XV level.

References

External links
 ESPN Profile
 Statbunker Profile

1983 births
Living people
Scottish rugby union players
Glasgow Warriors players
Stirling County RFC players
Scotland Club XV international rugby union players
Rugby union players from Wakefield
Rugby union props